Ministry of Irrigation may refer to:

Ministry of Irrigation (Nepal)
Ministry of Irrigation (Syria), the ministry of irrigation of Syria
Ministry of Irrigation and Water Resources (South Sudan)
Ministry of Irrigation and Water Resources Management, Sri Lanka
Ministry of Water Resources (Iraq), (also called, Ministry of Irrigation), the ministry of irrigation of Iraq